The 2008 LNFA season was the 14th season of American football in Spain.

L'Hospitalet Pioners were the champions.

Regular season

Playoffs
The playoffs were played between the four best qualified teams. The final, called LNFA Bowl, was played at the Estadío Olímpico de La Cartuja in Seville.

References

Liga Nacional de Fútbol Americano
2008 in Spanish sport
2008 in American football